FC Sheriff-2 Tiraspol is the reserve team of FC Sheriff Tiraspol. They play in the Divizia A, the second tier of Moldovan football. Despite winning seven Divizia A titles, they are denied promotion into the first tier solely due to the fact that Sheriff and Sheriff-2 can't play in the same division.

Honours
Divizia A
Winners (7): 1999–2000, 2000–01, 2007–08, 2011–12, 2014–15, 2016–17, 2021–22

Divizia B
Winners (1): 1997–98

Current squad

List of seasons

References

External links
Official site

Football clubs in Transnistria
Moldovan reserve football teams
 
Association football clubs established in 1997
FC Sheriff-2
FC Sheriff-2